Merton Lynn Dillon (April 4, 1924 - May 3, 2013) was a history professor and author in the United States. He wrote about slavery and abolitionism. He wrote books about abolitionists including Elijah P. Lovejoy and Benjamin Lundy.

Early life and professional career
Dillon was born in Addison, Michigan on April 4, 1924. He graduated from Michigan State Normal College in 1945, and began teaching at public schools. He earned a Masters of Arts from the University of Michigan in 1948, and a PhD in 1951. After that, he taught at the New Mexico Military Institute, Texas Tech College, Northern Illinois University, and Ohio State University.

In addition to his work as a professor and author, Dillon served on the Board of Editors for The Journal of Southern History, and chaired the Simkins Award Committee and Nominating Committee. Merton won a senior fellowship from the National Endowment for the Humanities. 

Merton L. Dillon died from Polymyositis in Michigan on May 3, 2013.

Books

Articles

Additional resources

References

1924 births
2013 deaths
University of Michigan alumni
Historians from Michigan